Sedenia aspasta is a moth in the family Crambidae. It is found in Australia, where it has been recorded from Western Australia.

References

Moths described in 1887
Spilomelinae